Nduga may refer to:

Ben Nduga, Ugandan sprinter
Nduga language of Western New Guinea
Nduga Regency of Highland Papua, Indonesia
Nduga massacre, 2018
Nduga hostage crisis, 2023